Al Jadaf (aka Al Jaddaf) is a rapid transit station on the Green Line of the Dubai Metro in Dubai, UAE. It serves as the penultimate station before the western terminus of the line.

The station opened on 1 March 2014 as part of an extension to the Green Line. It is close to the Jaddaf Waterfront.

See also
 Al Jaddaf Marine Station

References

Railway stations in the United Arab Emirates opened in 2014
Dubai Metro stations